The Behlim are Muslim people mainly found in North India and Pakistan. They are a sub-caste of the Rajputs. The Behlims trace their origin back to the great saint 
Sufi Masood  Ghazi. Behlim is derived from Urdu word "Baa-Ilm", meaning Knowledgeable. A large number can be found in Gujrat and Rajasthan.

History 
Behlim (Belim) is a sub-caste of Rajput and turk. The word is said to be a corruption of the word ba-ilm, meaning those who are knowledgeable in Arabic. The two distinct communities of Behlim (Belim) are  those of Gujarat and Rajasthan who are found mainly in (Mansa-ITADRA) Mehsana and Banaskantha districts, while those of Uttar Pradesh, Fatehpur India, are found mainly in the Doab region of that state.

Behlim community is a subcategory of the wider Shaikh community in South Asia.

Pakistan

Multan/Bahawalpur 
Behlim (Belim) families are present all over Pakistan, especially in Multan.Lodhi was a Rajput who started this sub-caste in 1486. Many welfare societies adopt the Rajput name. Punjabi Rajput Welfare Society is a well-known society in Multan. Behlim (Belim) family played a frontline role in the founding of this society. These families migrated from India during partition. Behlim are also in Pakistani city Gujarat.

Daharki/Sindh 
Behlim (Belim) families live in the Daharki in Ghotki District of Sindh. These families migrated from Northern India (Sirohi, Rajasthan) during partition.

Rahimyar Khan / Punjab 
Sohail Nasir, Fuzail Ahmed, Muhammad Asif, Abdul Rauf are renowned names of Behlim Families of rahimyar khan.

Other locations 
Behlim (Belim) families live in Vehari, Sahiwal (Maisi Tehsil Verhari and in central area of Sahiwal), Pakpatan, Khanewal, Kabirwala, Jhang/Faisalabad (Shorkot, Khurarianwala), Rahimyar Khan, Sadiqabad, Fatehpur-Shekhawati (Sikar-Rajasthan) and Khanpur.

Present circumstances

Gujarat 
The Behlim (Belim) is an agrarian community, found mostly in north Gujarat. According to some traditions, they were once Rajputs, and their customs are similar to other Muslim Rajput communities, such as the Maliks. The Behlim (Belim) intermarry with other Gujarati Muslim communities of similar status such as Pathan, Shaikh and Molesalam Rajputs. Unlike other Gujarati Muslims, they have no caste association and generally are allied to other Rajput landholding classes. They speak Gujarati and are Sunni Muslims.

Uttar Pradesh 
In Uttar Pradesh, the Behlim are found mainly in the Doab region. They claim to be of Turkic origin, arriving in India during the time of Iltutmish. The Behlim families of Bulandshahr played an important role in the city's history. Other Behlim are found in the districts of Meerut and Muzaffarnagar. In addition to the Doab Behlim, two other settlements are found in Gonda District and Basti District in eastern Uttar Pradesh. These Behlim have little or no connection with those of western Uttar Pradesh. Both communities speak Urdu, and as a largely urban community rarely speak local dialects of Hindi. They are largely Sunni. The community considers itself as belonging to the wider South Asia Shaikh community.

Rajasthan 

The population of Behlim is found across the state with concentrations in Sikar, Fatehpur Shekhawati, Sujangarh, Didwana, Ladnu, Kuchaman and Nagour. The Behlim Kingdom (Haveli) is situated in Fatehpur Shekhawati, built in 1922 by Haji Deen Mohammad Behlim, one of the prominent figures of the region. Rangrej is the oldest Behlim gotra with ancestors migrating from Afghanistan. Rangrej are found in other communities of Muslims, and are termed Behlim Rangrej in many parts of Rajasthan. The other gotra in Rajasthan are Khokhar, Gori, Chouhan, and Khilji. The Behlim Rangrej, Behlim Gori, Behlim Chouhan and Behlim Khilji communities are part of a broader community of Shaikh in Rajasthan. Most Rajasthan Behlim marry into other Gotra of Behlim, Shaikh, Kayamkhani, and Pathans. Most Behlims migrated from Pakistan after 1947. Urdu and Rajasthani is widely spoken in Behlims. Behlims are largely Sunni, while traces of Shia are found throughout the state.

References 

Muslim communities of India
Muslim communities of Pakistan
Muslim communities of Gujarat
Social groups of Gujarat
Social groups of Pakistan
Muslim communities of Uttar Pradesh
Social groups of Uttar Pradesh
Shaikh clans